Ivan John "Oscar" Skalberg (24 September 1929 – 13 November 2006) was an Australian rules footballer who played with North Melbourne in the Victorian Football League (VFL) and Brunswick and Camberwell in the Victorian Football Association (VFA).

Notes

External links 

1929 births
2006 deaths
Australian rules footballers from Victoria (Australia)
North Melbourne Football Club players
Brunswick Football Club players
Camberwell Football Club players